Bassa may refer to different places in Nigeria.

 Bassa, Kogi State, Nigeria
 Bassa, Plateau State, Nigeria